Düzkisla is a town (belde) in the Hasköy District, Muş Province, Turkey. Its population is 2,676 (2021).

References 

Western Armenia
Kurdish settlements in Turkey
Populated places in Muş Province